The black-headed jay or lanceolated jay (Garrulus lanceolatus) is roughly the same size as its close relative the Eurasian jay, but a little more slender overall except for the bill which is slightly shorter and thicker. The top of the head is black and it has a more obvious crest too and a longer tail.

It ranges from eastern Afghanistan eastwards, across the Himalayas, from India to Nepal and Bhutan. It occurs in wooded country with large areas of open ground rather than dense forest. It also occurs in some cultivated areas and even near villages as long as there are enough trees and scrubland nearby.

It feeds both on the ground and in trees, and takes virtually the same wide range of plant and animal foods as its close relative, including eggs and nestlings, as well as scraps near human habitation.

It nests in trees and suitable bushes and in this resembles the Eurasian jay in every respect. There are usually 3–5 eggs incubated over 16 days. Both parents feed the young.

The voice is very similar to its close relative too and is most often a loud screech but with longer pauses between.

Gallery

References

External links
 Avibase 

black-headed jay
Birds of Afghanistan
Birds of Pakistan
Birds of North India
Birds of Nepal
black-headed jay
Taxa named by Nicholas Aylward Vigors